Woodmont is an unincorporated community on the Potomac River in Morgan County in the U.S. state of West Virginia's Eastern Panhandle. Woodmont lies to the immediate west of the hamlet of Great Cacapon.

References

Unincorporated communities in Morgan County, West Virginia
Unincorporated communities in West Virginia
Baltimore and Ohio Railroad
West Virginia populated places on the Potomac River